The Gentleman Usher of the Green Rod is the Gentleman Usher to the Most Ancient and Most Noble Order of the Thistle, established in 1687.

Office holders from 1714 
1714–1761: Sir Thomas Brand
1762–1787: Robert Quarme
1787–1800: Matthew Robert Arnott
1800–1842: Robert Quarme the younger
1842–1884: Frederic Peel Round
1884–1895: Sir Duncan Campbell, 3rd Baronet (1856–1926)
1895–1917: Alan Murray, 6th Earl of Mansfield and Mansfield (1864–1935)
1917–1939: Brig.-Gen. Sir Robert Gordon Gilmour, 1st Baronet  (1857–1939)
1939–1953: Colonel Sir North Dalrymple-Hamilton (1883–1953)
1953–1958: Lieut.-Col. Sir Edward Stevenson KCVO MC (1895–1958)
1959–1979: Lieut.-Col. Sir Reginald Graham, 3rd Baronet VC OBE (1892–1980)
1979–1997: Rear Admiral David Dunbar-Nasmith CB DSC (1921–1997)
1997–present: Rear Admiral Christopher Hope Layman CB DSO LVO (born 1938)

References 

Ceremonial officers in the United Kingdom
Order of the Thistle
1687 establishments in Scotland